This is a list of mountain railways in operation in Switzerland. Most of them are located in the Alps, which include the highest European railways, both dead-end railways, such as the Jungfrau and Gornergrat, and railway crossings, such as the Bernina and Furka. Many of these railways converge on mountain railway hubs, notably Lucerne, Interlaken, Montreux, Aigle, Brig and Chur.

Lines that are both adhesion and standard gauge railways and part of the main Swiss (and European) rail network are boldfaced in the list. Cantons where the line continues but does not fit the aforementioned criteria are indicated in small letters.

This list only includes non-cable railways. For a list of funiculars, see List of funiculars in Switzerland, for a list of aerial tramways, see List of aerial tramways in Switzerland. For a list of individual railway stations, see List of highest railway stations in Switzerland.

List

See also
Rail transport in Switzerland
List of heritage railways and funiculars in Switzerland
List of highest paved roads in Switzerland
List of mountains of Switzerland accessible by public transport
Lists of tourist attractions in Switzerland

References
Swisstopo topographic maps

Mountain railways
Railway lines in Switzerland
Railways, mountain
Railway attractions in Switzerland